Floyd Hodge (born July 18, 1959) is a former American football wide receiver in the National Football League (NFL). He played for the Atlanta Falcons. He played college football at Utah as a wide receiver and quarterback.

References

1959 births
Living people
Players of American football from Compton, California
American football wide receivers
American football quarterbacks
Utah Utes football players
Atlanta Falcons players